Bhamo Township is a township of Bhamo District in the Kachin State of Burma. The principal town is Bhamo.

Towns and villages

Asin
Aw-ka-tha
Awngsa
Bansak
Bhamo
Bodewa
Budaung
Chiri Dumhpawng
Chyingma
Dumhpawng
Gahkyeng
Hakkhan
Hantet
Hinsaing
Hkadaung
Hkanlaing
Hkashang
Hkawan
Hko-nwe
Hmanlin
Hngetpyawdaw
Hpaulu
Htaira
Htonbo
Jeang
Kabani
Kadaw
Kamani
Kangyi
Kantha
Karing
Kaungsin
Kaungton
Kawabum
Kawahka
Kawnan
Kawngbu
Kho-kyin
Konkha
Kon-mahat
Kontein
Konywagyi
Kumbabum
Kwelon
Kyauk-aik
Kyauktalon
Kyauktan
Kyungyi
Kyunkon
Kyun-u
Kywegon
Kywegyo
Labang-gahtawng
Lahta-gahtawng
Lakang
Lamung-gahtawng
Lapaidan
Lawngpu
Letma
Letpandan
Longjung
Lonsadaung
Machyang
Madang
Mainghein
Maing Ka
Man Bung
Man Ho
Man Hpa
Man Kang
Man Kham
Man Law
Man Ma-kauk
Man Maw
Man Naung
Manpraw
Man The
Man Wein
Man Yut
Maran
Mawsaing
Mawtaung
Myale
Myazedi
Nakang
Namdaungmawn
Nampha
Namsai
Namsau
Namti
Nanhingyi
Nanlwin
Nanmapwe
Natyedwin Sakan
Naunghu
Naungka
Naungkhan
Naungkyo
Naunglan
Naungmo
Naungpyit
Nawngbya
Nawnghkyeng
Nawnghpawng
Nawngsai
Nayo
Ngakaw
Ngamu
Ngashang
Nyaungbindat
Nyaunggon
Pa-hok
Pahok
Palok
Panma
Papaung
Pinchein
Pinthet
Po Aung
Ponnesen
Pulaung
Punoi
Pyinga
Ritbum
Sama Dumhpawng
Sampenago
Sataw-gahtawng
Sawadi
Senien
Shalap
Shwebo
Shwegyaung
Shwekyina
Shwepu
Sihet
Si-in
Simun
Sindu
Sin Kin
Sintaw
Sithaung
Subotkon
Tagala
Tamaiklon
Taungni
Tawka
Teinthaw
Thabyebin
Thabye-gon
Thamainggyi
Thanbankyun
Thapanbin
Thathana
Theinlin
Thitson
U-ni-ya
Wabaw Dumhpawng
Walu
Waraseng
Wunnwedaung
Ye-ni
Yihku
Yondaung
Ywashe

References

 
Townships of Kachin State
Bhamo District